Akrotiri (Greek: Ακρωτήρι, pronounced ) was a Cycladic Bronze Age settlement on the volcanic Greek island of Santorini (Thera).

The settlement was destroyed in the Theran eruption sometime in the 16th century BC and buried in volcanic ash, which preserved the remains of fine frescoes and many objects and artworks. Akrotiri has been excavated since 1967 after earlier excavations on Santorini.

History
The earliest evidence for human habitation of Akrotiri can be traced back as early as the fifth millennium BC when it was a small fishing and farming village. By the end of the third millennium, this community developed and expanded significantly. One factor for Akrotiri's growth may be the trade relations it established with other cultures in the Aegean, as evidenced in fragments of foreign pottery at the site. Akrotiri's strategic position on the primary sailing route between Cyprus and Minoan Crete also made it an important point for the copper trade, thus allowing it to become an important centre for processing copper, as proven by the discovery of moulds and crucibles there. Akrotiri's prosperity continued for about another 500 years; paved streets, an extensive drainage system, the production of high-quality pottery and further craft specialization all point to the level of sophistication achieved by the settlement.

This all came to an end, however, in the 16th century BC with the volcanic eruption of Thera. There is a variety of dating evidence for the eruption, but its exact year is not known. Radiocarbon dating places it most probably between 1620 and 1530 BC, which is also in accord with the date range of 1570 to 1500 BC suggested by similarities of the material culture with other sites in the Aegean. Unusual growth patterns observed in tree rings in 1597, 1560, 1546 and 1544 BC are consistent with a major volcanic event in any of those years. The latter three dates might be the best candidates as they are also considered possible for Egyptian New Kingdom records that are thought to refer to the eruption.

Cycladic settlement
The Akrotiri excavation site is of a Cycladic cultural settlement on the Greek island of Santorini, associated with the Minoan civilization due to inscriptions in Linear A, and close similarities in artifact and fresco styles. The excavation is named for a modern village situated on a hill nearby. The name of the site in antiquity is unknown.

Akrotiri was buried by the massive Theran eruption in the middle of the second millennium BC (during the Late Minoan IA period); as a result, like the Roman ruins of Pompeii after it, it is remarkably well-preserved. Frescoes, pottery, furniture, advanced drainage systems and three-story buildings have been discovered at the site.

Excavations
The earliest excavations on the island of Santorini were conducted by French geologist F. Fouque in 1867 after some local people found old artifacts at a quarry. Later, in 1895–1900, the digs by German archeologist Baron Friedrich Hiller von Gaertringen revealed the ruins of ancient Thera on Mesa Vouno, which date from the archaic period, much after the Minoan eruption. Also, a little later, R. Zahn excavated in the locality of Potamos, near Akrotiri, under the auspices of the German Archaeological Institute at Athens.

The extensive modern excavation was started in 1967 by Spyridon Marinatos and revealed the full value of this site. Marinatos's choice of the site proved to be correct and just a few hours into the excavation, the remains of the buried city began to be discovered. The next step was to determine the extent of the city, to which it took two whole seasons devoted to the site in 1967 and 1968. In the early years of the excavation, a great deal of attention was paid towards the organization of proper facilities for the dig, including substantial workshops, laboratories built for storage, repair and treatment and areas for examination of archaeological finds. Because of the site being preserved in thick, volcanic debris, Marinatos noted that many of the buildings were preserved to a height of more than a single story, creating unique challenges for excavation. He experimented with tunnelling into the pumice, but this technique was later abandoned.

Excavated artifacts have been installed in a museum distant from the site (Museum of Prehistoric Thera), with many objects and artworks presented. Only a single gold object has been found, hidden beneath flooring, and no uninterred human skeletal remains have been found. This indicates that an orderly evacuation was performed with little or no loss of life.

An ambitious modern roof structure, meant to protect the site, collapsed just before its completion in 2005, killing one visitor. No damage was caused to the antiquities. As a result, the site was closed to visitors until April 2012. Excavations stopped since 2005 due to lack of funding. They were resumed in 2016 with sponsor support.

In October 2018, a small shrine with a marble figurine of a woman was discovered in the "House of the Thrania" which is located near Xeste 3, where a golden goat was found in 1999.

Frescoes

The frescoes in Akrotiri are especially important for the study of Minoan art because they are so much better preserved than those that were already known from Knossos and other sites on Crete, which have nearly all survived only in small fragments, usually fallen to the ground.

All of the pigments used by the artists at Akrotiri for painting the frescoes look as though they are mineral based and thus have resulted in the great preservation of the pieces. The colors used in Theran painting include white, yellow, red, brown, blue and black. The technique used is not true fresco, except for a few isolated instances, and instead appears as though the painting was begun while the plaster was still wet, but as though the artist made no effort to keep it wet, and seemed content to complete the work on a dry surface. As a result, often on the same fresco, the paint has penetrated the plaster in some areas but flakes off easily in others.

Specialized techniques were required when it was discovered early on in the excavation process that the site contained numerous well preserved fresco wall paintings. Tassos Margaritoff, one of the leading restorers of Byzantine frescoes, is currently the supervisor of the Akrotiri project. The first fragments of fresco were discovered in 1968 in Sector Alpha and depict the head of an African, the head of a blue monkey and some large flying blue birds.

In 1969, the fresco of the Blue Monkeys in Room Beta 6 was discovered and created increased excitement at the site. The rocky landscape which the monkeys are depicted climbing upon mimics the similar volcanic rocks near the site presently.

In 1970 the Spring Fresco was uncovered in Room Delta 2. It is the first fresco to have been found perfectly preserved and still standing in its original installed position. The supporting wall of the fresco was not in the best condition and thus the fresco had to be removed immediately in order to preserve it. Rescuing the fresco was a delicate procedure and allowed the archaeologists and restorers to develop invaluable experience.

A few other frescoes including The Fisherman and the Lady from the House of Ladies have been found standing, though detached from the wall.

Artifacts
The excavations at Akrotiri have produced a large variety of artifacts revealing numerous varieties of Late Cycladic (LC I) pottery from the area. Pottery is the most common and most enduring commodity in the culture of the majority of ancient societies and, thus, is of great importance to archaeologists in interpreting Ancient Greek societies. At Akrotiri, pottery is particularly abundant because of the circumstances surrounding the demise of the town, in that its sudden evacuation meant that inhabitants were only able to take their most valuable possessions with them.

Serving a multitude of purposes, pottery can tell a great deal about the society in which it were produced. Large jars were used as containers for storage of goods, while others like stirrup jars were designed for the transportation of certain commodities. As well, there were also vessels for preparing and cooking food, for eating and drinking and many other diverse activities, including bathtubs, braziers, oil lamps, bee-hives, flower pots, etc. Most evidently, the shape, size and perhaps even the decoration of the vases were closely related to their use in the ancient world.

In regards to furniture, the volcanic ash which engulfed the city often penetrated into the houses in large quantities and, in these layers of fine volcanic dust, produced negatives of the disintegrated wooden objects. Using these negatives as molds, liquid plaster-of-Paris can be poured in and produce casts of parts, or even entire pieces of furniture such as beds, tables, chairs or stools. Offering tables are one of the most common finds in Akrotiri and were either made of clay or coated with plaster, decorated in the same technique as the wall paintings, and only consisted of three highly decorated legs and a top.

Connecting path
There is a path descending from the first houses of the modern settlement to the parking lot of the excavations of Akrotiri, connecting the old excavation site to the town of Akrotiri. The path was signposted and reopened in September 2012 and now regularly undergoes maintenance, thanks to international volunteers. The local population has been the first supporter of this initiative and in charge of the upkeep of the path, working alongside the volunteers. The path is suitable for mountain biking, hiking and many other activities.

See also
 Summer Lovers, 1982 American film which filmed scenes at Akrotiri
 Akrotiri Boxer Frescoes, one of the frescoes at Akrotiri
 List of Aegean Frescoes
 Akrotiri, Santorini, a village located north of the ancient settlement

References

Further reading

External links

 
 

Populated places disestablished in the 2nd millennium BC
1867 archaeological discoveries
Minoan sites in the Cyclades
Santorini
Populated places in the ancient Aegean islands
Archaeological sites on the Aegean Islands
Former populated places in Greece
Ancient Thera
17th-century BC disestablishments
Disestablishments in the Minoan civilization
Natural disaster ghost towns